The Kylie Tapes: 94–98 is the VHS release by Australian singer-songwriter Kylie Minogue. It was released by Mushroom Records in 1998 in Australia only. It contains her music videos from 1994 to 1998.

Track listing

Formats
These are the formats of major video releases of The Kylie Tapes 94–98.

Notes

Kylie Minogue video albums
Music video compilation albums
1998 video albums
1998 compilation albums